Senator Hazelton may refer to:

George Cochrane Hazelton (1832–1922), Wisconsin State Senate
Gerry Whiting Hazelton (1829–1920), Wisconsin State Senate